Hawkridge Reservoir is a reservoir near Spaxton, Somerset, England.

The inflow is from several streams in the Quantock Hills Area of Outstanding Natural Beauty including Peart Water, which continues below the reservoir in a northeast direction to Spaxton, where it enters the Ashford Reservoir.

Since opening the reservoir has become home to a range of animals including; invertebrates, wildfowl and amphibians. It is used for angling with catches including Rainbow Trout.

References

External links

Drinking water reservoirs in England
Reservoirs in Somerset